This is a list of rockets launched from the Esrange rocket range in northern Sweden.

1966–1970

1971–1980

1981–1990

1991–2000

2001–2010

2011–2020

2021–2030

References

Kiruna
Space programme of Sweden